Peltos whistle-stop (Finnish: Pellon seisake, Swedish: Åkers hållplats) was a railway halt in Espoo, Finland midway between Espoo railway station & Kauklahti railway station, about 1.8 km from each.

Peltos halt was opened on 2 January 1931. The whistle-stop was planned to be abolished in 1978 but due a local small hospital and the wishes of a few locals it remained. The Peltos halt was very rarely used as the area is in a field and has very few houses near it. On 28 May 1995 Pelto whistle-stop was abolished due to extremely low number of users (estimated 5-20 per day.) There is currently nothing remaining of the whistle-stop; even the crossing was abolished in 2006. The L train was the only train that stopped at Pelto, and only if a passenger requested it to do so.

References

External links
Vaunut.org:  Kuvia Pellon seudulta – Pictures of the Peltos whistle stop (in Finnish)

Transport in Espoo
Railway stations opened in 1931
Railway stations closed in 1995